Easy to Idolize is a 2004 (see 2004 in music) album by Ilse Huizinga.

Track listing
 "That's All" (Alan Brandt, Bob Haymes) – 3:08 
 "The Sound of Music" (Richard Rodgers, Oscar Hammerstein II) – 2:08 
 "I Only Have Eyes for Eyes" – 3:00
 "Willow Weep for Me" (Ann Ronell) – 5:04 
 "The Thrill Is Gone" (Rick Darnell, Roy Hawkins) – 2:51
 "Skylark" (Hoagy Carmichael, Johnny Mercer) – 2:48
 "Easy to Love" (Cole Porter) – 3:48 
 "Some Day My Prince Will Come" (Frank Churchill, Larry Morey) – 2:37
 "Time After Time" (Sammy Cahn, Jule Styne) – 3:59
 "Isn't It Romantic?" (Rodgers, Lorenz Hart) – 2:21
 "The Nearness of You" (Carmichael, Ned Washington) – 4:11 
 "I'm a Fool to Want You" (Joel Herron, Frank Sinatra, Jack Wolf) – 2:20
 "When You Wish upon a Star" (Washington, Leigh Harline) – 2:58
 "All the Things You Are" (Jerome Kern, Hammerstein) – 3:16
 "Over the Rainbow" (Harold Arlen, Yip Harburg) – 3:20
 "A Child Is Born" (Thad Jones, Alec Wilder) – 3:38
 "I Love You" (Porter) – 1:54 
 "The Man I Love" (George Gershwin, Ira Gershwin) – 3:06
 "What'll I Do" (Irving Berlin) – 1:33

Personnel

 Ilse Huizinga - vocals
 Erik van der Luijt - grand piano, arranger
 Frans van der Hoeven - double bass
 Ben Schröder - drums
 Martijn van Iterson - guitar

Ilse Huizinga albums
2004 albums